Dale McKenna (May 7, 1937 – March 4, 2009) was a former American politician, who served in the Wisconsin State Senate.

Personal life
McKenna was born in Reeseville, Wisconsin. He graduated from St. Lawrence Seminary High School in Mount Calvary, Wisconsin, before graduating from St. Norbert College and the University of Wisconsin Law School and becoming a lawyer. From 1959 to 1962, he served in the United States Army.

Political career
McKenna was first elected to the Senate in a special election in 1969. In 1978, he was a candidate in the Democratic primary for Lieutenant Governor of Wisconsin and run on the gubernatorial ticket with incumbent Governor Martin J. Schreiber. He lost to Doug La Follette. Schreiber and La Follette would lose in the general election to the Republican ticket made up of Lee S. Dreyfus and Russell Olson. McKenna died on March 4, 2009.

References

People from Dodge County, Wisconsin
People from Fond du Lac County, Wisconsin
Democratic Party Wisconsin state senators
Wisconsin lawyers
Military personnel from Wisconsin
United States Army soldiers
St. Norbert College alumni
University of Wisconsin Law School alumni
1937 births
2009 deaths
20th-century American politicians
Catholics from Wisconsin
20th-century American lawyers